You're a Big Boy Now is a soundtrack album by the Lovin' Spoonful, released in 1967, containing music from the Francis Ford Coppola film of the same name. Composed entirely by Spoonful member John Sebastian, it contains several songs performed by the band, as well as instrumental music from the film score.

It was re-released on CD along with What's Up, Tiger Lily?, the Spoonful's soundtrack for the 1967 Woody Allen film.

Reception
The songs "Darling Be Home Soon" and "You're a Big Boy Now" were released as singles on the Kama Sutra label. Although the album and title-track single were not popular, "Darling Be Home Soon" was a hit, reaching #15 on the U.S. charts and #8 on the Canadian charts, and inspiring cover versions by many other artists.

Music critic William Ruhlmann wrote of the album, "Most of the rest of the score consisted of instrumentals, many augmented by an uncredited orchestra, but Sebastian's title song was also impressive."

Track listing
All songs by John Sebastian.

Side one
"You're a Big Boy Now" – 2:28
"Lonely (Amy's Theme)" – 3:19
"Wash Her Away (From the Discotheque)" – 2:31
"Kite Chase" – 1:21
"Try and Be Happy" – 1:04
"Peep Show Percussion" – 1:19
"Girl, Beautiful Girl (Barbara's Theme)" – 2:23

Side two
"Darling Be Home Soon" – 3:34
"Dixieland Big Boy" – 1:13
"Letter to Barbara" – 0:59
"Barbara's Theme (From the Discotheque)" – 1:26
"Miss Thing's Thang" – 1:02
"March" – 2:28
"The Finale" – 2:28

References

The Lovin' Spoonful albums
1967 soundtrack albums
Comedy film soundtracks
Albums produced by Erik Jacobsen